Presidential elections were held in Austria on 23 June 1974 after incumbent President Franz Jonas died on 24 April. The Socialist Party nominated Foreign Minister Rudolf Kirchschläger, who won the election with 52% of the vote. The only other candidate was the mayor of Innsbruck, Alois Lugger, of the Austrian People's Party.

Results

References

Presidential elections in Austria
President
Austria
Austria